Gary Daniel Liddle (born 15 June 1986) is an English professional footballer who plays as a centre-back or midfielder for Northern Premier League side South Shields. He has played in the English Football League for Hartlepool United, Notts County, Bradford City, Chesterfield, Carlisle United and Walsall.

Liddle came through the ranks at Middlesbrough where he won the FA Youth Cup in 2004. After leaving Middlesbrough, Liddle signed for local League Two side Hartlepool United where he would play an important role in Hartlepool's promotion to League One as runners-up. He would remain at the League One side for six seasons before departing for Notts County in 2012. Liddle won several individual awards in his first season with the Magpies and would stay with Notts County for two years before subsequently signing for Bradford City, Chesterfield, Carlisle United and Walsall. He was sent on loan to former club Hartlepool United in 2019 who were now in the National League. He then signed permanently for the club where he would play an integral role in central defence as Hartlepool won the 2021 National League play-off Final. He left at the end of Hartlepool's first season back in the Football League having made 364 appearances over three spells at the club, making him the tenth highest appearance maker in the club's history. Liddle then joined Northern Premier League side South Shields.

Career

Middlesbrough
Liddle was born in Middlesbrough, North Yorkshire. He began his career with hometown side Middlesbrough. He was a regular in the academy sides and won the 2003–04 FA Youth Cup. He signed a professional contract with Middlesbrough on 14 July 2003.

Hartlepool United
In August 2006, Liddle joined nearby League Two club Hartlepool United on a free transfer, signed by Danny Wilson. He made his debut in a League Cup win at Burnley on 22 August 2006 in central midfield. He made a big impression during his first season with Pools and performed well at right-back, centre-half and midfield. He shared the Players' Player of the Year award with Michael Nelson that year as Pools were promoted back to League One at the first attempt. He remained a mainstay in the side. In 2010, Liddle was booked in a game at Leyton Orient, which meant an instant suspension was triggered after collecting his 10th yellow card of the season. However, no-one at the club realised he had been cautioned and he played 48 hours later against Brighton & Hove Albion. Pools then recognised later he should have not appeared and informed the FA. Pools were charged with fielding an ineligible player and deducted 3 points. That meant with 1 game of the season to go, they were in a relegation battle, but a draw at Brentford on the final day of the season kept them up.

On 13 August 2011, while playing in a home league match against Walsall, Liddle suffered an injury, as his zygomatic bone became fractured in two places. He was able to complete the match, which ended in a 1–1 draw. However, he was sidelined afterwards. For his return to playing, he wore a protective mask.

On 19 May 2012, it was announced that Liddle was released from Hartlepool United after six years after he rejected a new deal. He made 238 appearances for the club during his first spell with the club.

Notts County
Liddle signed for League One club Notts County on 21 June 2012 on a two-year contract. Liddle stated that it was Keith Curle's desire to manage in the Championship that played a big part in the switch. "Keith wants to manage in the Championship with Notts. That's why I came here. Hopefully I can help him do that". Before the start of the 2012–13 season, Liddle admitted there was a challenge to earn a first team spot. "It's the most competitive squad I've ever been in, If I get the shirt I will have to play well to keep it and if I'm not in the team I'll have to work even harder in training to get in there."

He made his competitive debut for the club in a 2–1 victory over Crewe Alexandra, partnering Dean Leacock in the centre of defence. Liddle made a good start to his career at Notts County and was awarded the PFA Fans' Player of the Month for September, continuing to play at centre back, he ensured County remained unbeaten in that month.

Liddle made his final and 46th league appearance of the season against Coventry City. It meant he had played every minute of the 2012–13 season, equalling a record last set by County's Pedro Richards 30 years ago. He then won four awards at the clubs' end of season award ceremony. Including; The Manager's Player of the Year, Players' Player of the Year, Fans' Player of the Year and the Supporters' Club Player of the Year.

Bradford City
Liddle signed for Bradford City on 9 June 2014 on a one-year contract with the option of an additional year. He made his debut on 9 August 2016 in a 3–2 home win against Coventry City.

Chesterfield
Liddle signed for Chesterfield on 1 February 2016 for an undisclosed fee. He was named the club's captain. Liddle was sent off in his third appearance for the 'Spireites', on 16 February 2016 in an away game to Colchester United for an 18th minute foul. Liddle scored his first goal for the club on 13 August 2016, scoring the first in a 3–1 victory over Swindon Town, heading into an empty net after a Ched Evans free kick was saved.

Carlisle United
Liddle signed for League Two club Carlisle United on 13 January 2017 on a one-and-half-year contract for an undisclosed fee. He was released by Carlisle at the end of the 2018–19 season.

Walsall
On 26 July 2019, Liddle moved to Walsall, signed by his former Hartlepool teammate Darrell Clarke. He made 16 appearances for The Saddlers, before leaving on loan for his former club Hartlepool United, in the National League where he played as a central defender.

Return to Hartlepool United
Liddle re-signed for Hartlepool permanently for a second time after a successful loan spell in the previous season from Walsall. Liddle's first appearance in his third spell at Hartlepool saw him reach the landmark of 300 appearances for Hartlepool United in a 2–1 win against Aldershot Town. Liddle played in the 2021 National League play-off Final as Hartlepool defeated Torquay United on penalties to earn promotion back to the Football League. Following their promotion, Liddle signed a new one-year deal with the club. On 5 March 2022, Liddle made his 700th career appearance in a 2–1 win at Harrogate Town.

On 6 June 2022, it was announced that Liddle had decided to leave Hartlepool upon the expiration of his contract. During his three spells with Hartlepool United, Liddle made 364 appearances, making him the tenth highest appearance maker in the club's history.

South Shields
On the same day Liddle announced his departure from Hartlepool, he signed for South Shields.

Career statistics

Honours
Middlesbrough
FA Youth Cup: 2003–04

Hartlepool United
Football League Two runner-up: 2006–07
National League play-offs: 2021

Individual
Notts County Player of the Year: 2012–13
Notts County Manager's Player of the Year: 2012–13
Notts County Players' Player of the Year: 2012–13

References

External links

1986 births
Living people
Footballers from Middlesbrough
English footballers
Association football defenders
Association football midfielders
Middlesbrough F.C. players
Hartlepool United F.C. players
Notts County F.C. players
Bradford City A.F.C. players
Chesterfield F.C. players
Carlisle United F.C. players
Walsall F.C. players
South Shields F.C. (1974) players
English Football League players
National League (English football) players
Northern Premier League players